Erica Carney (née Allar; born November 5, 1985) is an American former professional racing cyclist, who rode professionally in 2009 and between 2014 and 2019 for the  and  teams.

Major results

2007
 2nd Keirin, Australian National Track Championships
2008
 10th Liberty Classic
2009
 1st Clarendon Cup
2010
 2nd Criterium, National Road Championships
2012
 1st Sunny King Criterium
 1st TD Bank Mayor's Cup
 3rd Overall Tour of America's Dairyland
2013
 1st TD Bank Mayor's Cup
 2nd Sunny King Criterium
2014
 1st Tour of Somerville
 2nd Criterium, National Road Championships
 2nd Overall Tour of America's Dairyland
 2nd Sunny King Criterium
 4th Winston-Salem Cycling Classic
2015
 1st Overall Tulsa Tough
1st Stages 1 & 3
 3rd Sunny King Criterium
2017
 1st  Criterium, National Road Championships
 2nd Sunny King Criterium
2018
 2nd Athens Twilight Criterium

See also
 List of 2016 UCI Women's Teams and riders

References

External links
 
 

1985 births
Living people
American female cyclists
Sportspeople from Lehigh County, Pennsylvania
21st-century American women